Will Hicks is a Grammy-nominated British record producer, songwriter and musician most noted for his work with Jamie Lawson and Ed Sheeran.

Early life
Will Hicks was born and grew up in the English county of Herefordshire. He started playing guitar at the age of 10, picking up bass and piano soon after. He joined his first band aged 12, though aged 16 he was pushed towards music production after falling in love with the recording process at a friend's father's studio and realising the much greater satisfaction producing gave him compared with performing on stage.

Production, mixing and engineering work
After college, Hicks worked as a session guitarist and sound engineer in London for some time before working in artist development and production for Elton John's Rocket Music Studios in London's Kensington and New York. Over the years, Hicks worked with a vast variety of musicians such as Lily Allen, James Blunt, One Direction and Ed Sheeran as record producer and recording mix engineer. His work in artist development for 21st Century Management and Rocket Music Management also resulted in the discovery of and work with Anne-Marie and Bastille.

In 2014, Will Hicks's work vocal editing and engineering songs on Ed Sheeran's multi-Platinum certified album "x" earned him a Grammy nomination in the "Album of the Year" category of 2014.

In 2015, Hicks produced Jamie Lawson's self-titled debut release Jamie Lawson on Sheeran's own Gingerbread Man Records label. The album charted at number 1 on the UK Albums Chart and was certified Gold. Its lead single was the UK Top 10 charting "Wasn't Expecting That", which was certified Platinum as well as winning Best Song (Musically and Lyrically) at the 2016 Ivor Novello Awards.

In 2017 Will Hicks produced Ed Sheeran's hit single "Perfect" from the album ÷ as well as the follow-up digital release of the duet version with Beyoncé. The album was nominated for Best Pop Vocal Album at the 60th Annual Grammy Awards.

Hicks's approach to production has earned him the reputation of being "a singer's producer", dedicating an unusual amount of time to the vocal production of a track, "framing a voice with instruments and pieces of music to make people feel the emotion of a song". Parallels have been drawn to the work of Swedish record producer Bo Tretow and Pharrell Williams. His method developed from his early career when, long before working with famous musicians, he would "record anyone for free" to learn through trial and error and hone his recording method.

Selected discography

References

Living people
1984 births